"Don't You Come Cryin" is the second single from the album Linear, released by freestyle music group Linear in 1990. As a single, the song reached No. 70 on the Billboard Hot 100.

Charts

References

1990 singles
Linear (group) songs
1990 songs